Thomas Paul Hart (29 June 1896 – 25 May 1971) was an Australian rules footballer who played for Carlton in the Victorian Football League (VFL) and Norwood in South Australia.

Originally with Norwood, Hart was a half forward flanker. He was wounded in France during World War 1 combat, at the age of 20, but survived. On return to the SAFL, Hart continued to perform well for Norwood and was the league's leading goal-kicker after kicking 50 goals in 1922, a premiership year.

Carlton lured him to their club in 1923 but he only spent a season with them before returning to South Australia. He kicked two goals in debut and a further two in all but one of his next six games. Hart then played at West Adelaide until his retirement.

References
Holmesby, Russell and Main, Jim (2007). The Encyclopedia of AFL Footballers. 7th ed. Melbourne: Bas Publishing.

External links

1896 births
1971 deaths
Carlton Football Club players
Norwood Football Club players
West Adelaide Football Club players
Australian rules footballers from South Australia